Joseph Ludovic Van Stichel (born 7 February 1928) was a Belgian rower. He competed in the men's double sculls event at the 1952 Summer Olympics.

References

External links
 

1928 births
Possibly living people
Belgian male rowers
Olympic rowers of Belgium
Rowers at the 1952 Summer Olympics
Sportspeople from Antwerp